Jamesdicksonia is a genus of fungi belonging to the family Georgefischeriaceae.

The genus was first described by Mandayani Jeersannidhi Thirumalachar, Pavgi and Payak in 1961.

The genus has cosmopolitan distribution.

Species:
 Jamesdicksonia dactylidis (Pass.) R.Bauer, Begerow, A.Nagler & Oberw.

References

Basidiomycota
Basidiomycota genera